Altenia scriptella is a moth of the family Gelechiidae. It is found from most of Europe, to the Volga region, Turkey and the Caucasus.

The wingspan is 10–15 mm. Adults are on wing from June to July in one generation per year.

The larvae feed on Acer campestris, Acer pseudoplatanus and Acer platanoides. They in a folded leaf of their host plant. The species overwinters in the pupal stage.

References

External links

Lepiforum.de

Moths described in 1796
Altenia
Moths of Europe
Moths of Asia
Taxa named by Jacob Hübner